Leeyti Tyukuli (ruled c.1440 – c.1450) was the fifth ruler, or Burba, of the Jolof Empire.

References

15th-century monarchs in Africa
Year of birth missing
1450 deaths